Days Gone is a 2019 action-adventure video game developed by Bend Studio and published by Sony Interactive Entertainment for the PlayStation 4. A Windows port was released in May 2021.

The game is set in post-apocalyptic Oregon two years after the start of a pandemic that turned a portion of humanity into vicious zombie-like creatures. Former outlaw-turned-drifter Deacon St. John discovers his wife Sarah, having been assumed dead, may still be alive and goes on a quest to find her. Days Gone is played from a third-person perspective in which the player can explore an open world environment. Players can use firearms, melee weapons, and improvised weapons, and can use stealth to defend themselves against hostile humans and cannibalistic creatures known as Freakers. A major game mechanic is Deacon's motorcycle, which is used as the player character's main mode of transportation.

Days Gone was Bend Studio's first open-world project, its first original property since Syphon Filter (1999), and its first development project for home consoles after spending decades working on spinoff games for handheld consoles. The game's development took approximately six years; Bend Studio expanded nearly three-fold to support it. Major sources of inspiration for Days Gone were World War Z, The Walking Dead and Sons of Anarchy. The game was unveiled at E3 2016; its release was originally planned for 2018 but was delayed several times. 

Upon release, it received mixed reviews from critics, who criticized the story, mission design, and technical issues but praised the graphics, artificial intelligence, and Sam Witwer's performance as Deacon. Days Gone was a commercial success; it sold more copies than all of Bend Studio's previous games combined and became the 19th-best-selling game of 2019 in the US. In 2021, it was reported that the development team had unsuccessfully pitched a sequel to Sony.

Gameplay 

Days Gone is a third-person action-adventure game set in a post-apocalyptic open world. The player controls Deacon St. John, an outlaw-turned-drifter-bounty-hunter who prefers life on the road to wilderness encampments. The game takes place two years after a pandemic killed almost all of humanity and transformed millions of others into "Freakers", mindless, zombie-like creatures that evolve quickly. Swarmers, a nocturnal type of Freaker, hide in their nests during daytime but often congregate, wander around, and search for food and water at night. Players can lure Swarmers toward other enemies, causing the two groups to fight one another. Other enemies include Newts, who are infected adolescents and opportunistic hunters who only attack Deacon when he enters their territory or has poor health. The game includes infected wildlife (called Runners and Ragers) and hostile human enemies. Players can be overwhelmed by hordes and must keep their distance. Deacon can use firearms, melee weapons, traps, explosives and choke points to kill Freakers.

The game is set in an open world in the Pacific Northwest. Players can freely explore the world on foot or using a motorcycle. The bike consumes fuel and becomes disabled if excessively damaged. Players must regularly refuel the bike at gas stations and camps, and repair it using collected scraps. Deacon must establish trust with settlement camps and earn "camp credits" by completing missions, and by completing bounties and selling food. As the level of trust increases, players can purchase new weapons, supplies and motorcycle parts that can be used to enhance its speed, durability and maneuverability. The bike's appearance can be customized.

As players explore the world, they must collect valuable resources and components for crafting weapons and supplies. In addition to the main quests, the game has a number of side objectives, which include clearing Freaker nests, rescuing hostages, clearing enemy camps, capturing bounty targets, and restoring power to National Emergency Response Organization (NERO) checkpoints. Inside NERO checkpoints, players can use NERO injectors to boost Deacon's health; stamina, used when Deacon is sprinting or dodging; and focus, which allows Deacon to temporarily slow down time while aiming his ranged weapons. Fast travel consumes fuel and causes time to pass. Before players can fast travel, they must destroy all Freaker nests between the two fast travel points. As players complete missions and objectives, they gain experience points (XP). With sufficient XP, players can level up and unlock new abilities, allowing them to increase the efficiency of Deacon's melee weapons and ranged weapons, and to enhance his survival skills.

Players can complete objectives in multiple ways, such as by using stealth tactics to distract enemies or silently kill them from behind using a combat knife. Noise suppressors can be attached to various firearms to prevent attracting nearby enemies. Deacon can use "survival vision", which, once activated, highlights items of interest and the locations of nearby enemies. Players can use Deacon's binoculars to locate enemies. Alternatively, players have access to a wide variety of firearms such as pistols, shotguns, sniper rifles, submachine guns and crossbows. Different weapons have different statistics and higher-tier weapons are generally more powerful. Purchased weapons can be stored in a gun locker, though weapons that are picked up in the field cannot be put into storage. Players can use explosives such as proximity mines and grenades, and may craft molotov cocktails to defeat enemies. Melee weapons can be used but they will break if not repaired regularly.

Plot 

A virus has decimated the globe, turning a large portion of humanity into violent zombie-like creatures called Freakers. In Oregon, outlaw bikers Deacon St. John (Sam Witwer) and William "Boozer" Gray (Jim Pirri), alongside Deacon's wife Sarah Whitaker (Courtnee Draper), attempt to flee to safety. They find a NERO helicopter that has room for two more occupants. While Sarah boards the helicopter, Boozer is injured and Deacon stays behind to help him after promising to reunite with his wife.

Two years later, Deacon and Boozer are working in the Pacific Northwest as mercenaries. Sarah is assumed dead because the NERO refugee camp she was believed to have been staying in was overrun by Freakers. The two men plan to head north in search of a better life but they are attacked by a gang of cultists, the Rippers. Boozer's arm is burned in the attack and Deacon searches for medical supplies to help him recover. Later, the two learn that the Rippers have placed a bounty on their heads. Deacon sees a NERO helicopter and follows it, eventually meeting James O'Brian (Bernardo de Paula), the researcher who evacuated Sarah two years earlier. O'Brian reveals that Sarah's helicopter was diverted to a different camp mid-flight, leaving the possibility that she is still alive.

Boozer's health continues to decline and Deacon takes him to the Lost Lake camp, which is led by "Iron" Mike Wilcox (Eric Allan Kramer) and Raymond "Skizzo" Sarkozi (Jason Spisak). As a doctor amputates Boozer's gangrenous arm, O'Brian contacts Deacon and offers to help him find Sarah if Deacon aids in NERO's ongoing research project. Skizzo is distrustful of the Rippers' uneasy alliance with Lost Lake; he makes his own deal and turns Deacon over to the cult. Deacon learns the Rippers' leader "Carlos" is actually Jessie Williamson (Scott Whyte), an enemy from his motorcycle-club days. Deacon escapes from the Rippers' camp and returns to Lost Lake where it is under attack by the Rippers. Deacon exposes Skizzo to Iron Mike, and Iron Mike talks down Jesse, ending the attack. Skizzo is arrested. With Boozer's help Deacon uses explosives to destroy the dam above the Rippers' camp, flooding the compound and drowning most of the Rippers while Deacon kills Jessie in single combat. After Deacon returns, Iron Mike reveals he released Skizzo to spare his life.

Deacon realizes that Sarah, a government researcher with federal security clearance, would have been prioritized during a camp evacuation, and O'Brian confirms that she was moved to a military outpost at Crater Lake, which is now controlled by the Deschutes County Militia. He warns Deacon that the Freakers are evolving rapidly and becoming more dangerous. Deacon wins over the militia's leader, Colonel Matthew Garret (Daniel Riordan) and reunites with Sarah, who is working to create a bio-weapon to destroy the Freakers. Deacon and Sarah decide to obtain a DNA sequencer at her old lab, where they discover that her research was used to develop the Freaker virus.

At the lab, Sarah reveals that she is working to cure the Freakers rather than destroy them. Deacon suggests they finish the cure at her new lab, but an increasingly paranoid Garret puts Sarah into protective custody. Garret, shown over time to be a religious fanatic, reveals that he believes other human factions are a bigger danger than the Freakers, and declares a holy war against all other camps. Deacon attempts to save Sarah but is foiled and arrested by Skizzo, who has joined the militia. A sympathetic officer Derrick Kouri (Phil Morris) defects from the militia and frees Deacon, who returns to Lost Lake. Lost Lake camp successfully defends against the militia attack, but Iron Mike is mortally wounded and dies shortly after. Deacon rallies the remaining members of the Lost Lake camp together with the members of Copeland's and Tuck/Alki's camps to retaliate against the militia by attacking their headquarters with a truck bomb. Deacon kills Skizzo and Sarah poisons Garret, ending the militia.

Deacon, Sarah, Boozer and their friends settle at Lost Lake. O'Brian contacts Deacon and reveals that NERO always knew about the virus's mutagenic effects, and that he himself is a mutated Freaker. He warns Deacon that NERO is coming and that nothing will stop them.

Development

Days Gone was developed by Bend Studio, one of Sony's first-party developers. The game's core development team included studio director Christopher Reese, game director Jeff Ross, and creative director John Garvin, all of whom had worked at Bend Studio since the 1990s, when it was creating Syphon Filter. Days Gone is the company's first open world game, its first original intellectual property since Syphon Filter (1999), and its first game to be released for home consoles since Syphon Filter: Logan's Shadow (2007).

Full production of Days Gone commenced in early 2015 and the game's development cycle lasted for six years. The developers were inspired by World War Z, The Walking Dead and Sons of Anarchy, which were popular at the beginning of the game's development, during which Bend Studio significantly expanded and the development team increased from around 50 to 130. The game's development was completed on March 10, 2019, and Bend Studio confirmed it had been declared gold, indicating the game was being prepared for duplication and release.

Design
During the game's pre-production, the team decided it would be an open world project. The game is set in Central Oregon, where Bend Studio is located. According to Garvin, Central Oregon has diverse terrain and landscapes ranging from snowy mountains to deserts, making it an ideal setting for a sandbox title. According to lead designer Eric Jensen, the open world mechanics of Days Gone were designed by a small team of five or six developers who "had to think smart and efficient with all of our design choices knowing the manpower limitations". The studio initially underestimated the manpower needed to develop the project, thinking a team of 50 people would suffice. While the game is open world, the team omitted a good deal of filler content. Most of the game's missions are scripted and connected to its main story. The team's goal was to replicate the successes of linear games such as the Uncharted series in an open world setting.

While the enemies featured in the game are similar to zombies, Bend Studio named them "Freakers". The Swarmers in the game were inspired by "a guy who was doing a YouTube video where he was moving weird", while the Newts were inspired by contortionists. Swarmers may congregate to form a horde of 50 to 500. To better optimize the horde, Swarmers are divided into small clusters. If they are close to the player, some of these horde clusters will split off from the main group, making them easier for players to manage. In a large horde, there are eight Swarmer character models; the team modified the height of each one to make their appearance and behaviors unique. The team spent a lot of time working on the group artificial intelligence (AI) to ensure the horde would not only charge at Deacon in a straight line but would also make use of the terrain to overwhelm the player character.

Days Gone has multiple, intertwined stories, which allows players to switch between narratives. The team wanted to keep the narrative interesting and fresh. The game constantly keeps track of player's progress. The team were inspired by Netflix's menu. The game initially allowed Deacon to make decisions that can change the narrative; this feature was removed from the final game because the team had difficulty showing players the impacts of these decisions. According to Garvin, by removing these narrative choices, Deacon's personality would be better reflected because some of these choices may allow him to commit egregious or cruel actions that do not fit his personality.

According to Garvin, the game's main theme is "redemption". The journey would see Deacon, who is often seen as an outsider, grow and evolve into a capable leader. Garvin added that despite the game's post-apocalyptic setting, the team aimed to deliver a more hopeful theme because the story of Deacon concerns the way he can make the world a better place and explores the idea that surviving is not the same as living. The game's story and themes were inspired by The Road, The Passage and I Am Legend. Because Deacon is a member of a motorcycle club, the team researched the biker gang Hells Angels.

Music

Garvin, who was impressed by his work on The Purge: Anarchy, invited Nathan Whitehead to compose the music for Days Gone, which was performed by the Nashville Scoring Orchestra and soloists. Whitehead spent two years working on the game's soundtrack. The instrumentation is centered around guitar, which Whitehead said was an "obvious choice" for both the character of Deacon—a bounty hunter and biker—and for the Pacific Northwest setting. Whitehead added that the game's music, which combines "folk Americana and a touch of rock elements", is a good fit for the setting. To accommodate the video game medium's interactivity, the score for Days Gone was built up in layers that the game engine could add or remove. As a result, the score dynamically changes in accordance with the gameplay.

Release

Publisher Sony Interactive Entertainment unveiled Days Gone at E3 2016. While the game was originally planned for a 2018 release, it was delayed to the following year. The release was postponed from February 22, 2019, to April 26 in the same year to avoid competing with other triple-A titles such as Metro: Exodus and Anthem. As part of Sony's efforts to bring more of its first-party content to personal computers following Horizon Zero Dawn, Days Gone released for Windows via Steam and Epic Games Store on May 18, 2021.

Upon release, Bend Studio supported the game with free downloadable content. In June 2019, Survival difficulty mode, which modifies the head-up display and disables options to fast travel, was introduced. This was followed by 12 weekly challenges, in each of which players' performances are classified into Gold, Silver and Bronze rankings. Players receive credits that can be used to purchase new characters and other accessories. In September 2019, Bend added New Game Plus and the MB-150, a sniper rifle from the Syphon Filter series, into the game. Bike tanks, decorations, and frame paint inspired by Death Stranding were released in November 2019.

Reception

Critical reception

At Metacritic, Days Gone was met with "mixed or average reviews" for the PS4 version and "generally favorable reviews" for the PC version.

The game's open world and design received mixed reviews. Matthew Kato from Game Informer was disappointed by the lack of content in the world; he said most side objectives were filler content that was neither engaging nor interesting. This sentiment was shared by Eurogamers Malindy Hetfeld, who said in Days Gone, players are "doing the exact same thing, in the exact same way, for hours on end." Leon Hurley from GamesRadar said the open world design is fairly unoriginal despite being entertaining. Shacknewss Bill Lavoy liked the way the game remembers the player's actions through its systems. For instance, once players clear out a horde, it does not respawn, and the area becomes safer. Lavoy, however, noted the small scale of the map and criticized the way Days Gone uses environmental obstacles to force players to navigate longer distances. Several reviewers felt that the world is empty and sparse because the game's locations were not given a strong visual identity or backstory, making exploration meaningless.

Defeating a horde was often singled out as one of the game's highlights. Kato described the experience as "terrifying" and "tense", and applauded the artificial intelligence for being unpredictable, meaning that different trials may lead to vastly different outcomes. Kallie Plagge from GameSpot liked fighting the horde, calling it "exhilarating" and "satisfying," though she criticized several campaign missions that tasked the players to clear these hordes in a nearly back-to-back manner, making the experience exhausting. Stealth mechanics were commonly criticized by reviewers for being too basic and boring. Dean Takahashi disliked the clunkiness of the shooting mechanics, since the game lacked an option to shoot backward while being chased by Freakers. Both Takahashi and Hurley liked the progression system, and remarked that Deacon gradually became more powerful in the game. The motorcycle, which was the only way to navigate the world, received mixed opinions, with Hurley adding that he slowly grew attached to Deacon's bike because the game required the player to care for it during the campaign. However, the need to refuel the bike discouraged some reviewers from exploring the game's world, and some regarded it as a major source of tedium. Many reviewers were not impressed by the Freakers because of their similarity to zombies.

The story received mixed reviews. Writing for VentureBeat, Takahashi said the story is engaging but that he was disappointed that some storylines were not completely resolved by the end of the game. Lavoy said the story and some of its elements were too long. Some critics said the story gradually became more interesting as more characters and more emotional moments were introduced. Andrew Webster from The Verge called the story bland and compared the game unfavorably to The Last of Us, which was also published by Sony. Hetfield criticized the interwoven storylines, which he said distracted players from completing the central mission. Narrative missions were also criticized for lacking impact, consequences and any form of meaningful conclusion. O'Brien was unimpressed by the game's overly serious tone. While she liked the supporting characters, she said the antagonists were one-dimensional. Deacon as a protagonist received mixed reactions; Takahashi described him as an "interesting and flawed character," and enjoyed seeing Deacon grow and evolve. Plagge was critical of Deacon as a character, calling him "selfish" and adding that the story is centered around "validating his actions and feelings above all else." Webster disliked Deacon's personality and said he found connecting with the character very difficult. Witwer's performance was generally praised by critics.

The game was criticized for its technical issues. Kato said the game lacks the polish found in Sony's other first-party games. Takahashi criticized the game's bugs and unstable frame rate. The game's frequent loading screens, which appear between gameplay and cutscenes, were also criticized.

Sales

Days Gone was the best-selling physical game in the United Kingdom in the week of release. It went on to be the best-selling software release in all the format sales charts for three consecutive weeks. In Japan, Days Gone outsold two other PlayStation 4-exclusive games at launch, God of War and Horizon Zero Dawn. Days Gone exceeded the lifetime Japanese sales of God of War and The Last Guardian, another exclusive PlayStation 4 game. In the first three days after its launch, Days Gone sold approximately 114,319 physical units.

In North America, Days Gone was the second-best-selling video game for April 2019, behind Mortal Kombat 11, making it the seventh-highest debut in sales for a Sony-published title, and the best-selling game developed by Bend Studio. By June 2019, Days Gone was the eighth-best-selling video game of the year. It was the 19th-best-selling game of 2019 in the US. According to game director Jeff Ross, Days Gone sold more copies than all of Bend Studio's previous games combined.

In January 2022, Days Gone's director Jeff Ross claimed on Twitter that the game had sold over 8 million copies by late 2020. However, this stat was disputed by several gaming outlets.

Awards

Possible sequel 

On April 9, 2021, Jason Schreier of Bloomberg News revealed Bend Studio had pitched a sequel to Days Gone but that the first game's mixed critical reception and lengthy development process caused Sony to reject the proposal. Shortly afterward, Ross confirmed Days Gone 2 had been pitched to Sony but that many of the details could not be confirmed due to a non-disclosure agreement. He revealed that part of the plan for the sequel was a "shared universe with co-op play," which was not included in the original Days Gone due to staffing constraints.

While appearing on a podcast with David Jaffe, the creator of the God of War franchise, Garvin said, "If you love a game, buy it at fucking full price," and implied Days Gone did not receive a sequel partly because it did not turn enough profit. Garvin came under fire for his remarks; commenters said Days Gone had already benefitted from fan support during its release, and that it was unreasonable to ask someone to spend US$70 on an unknown game. Others noted that Sony ultimately controls sales of PlayStation games and offers free demos, and the blame could not be placed entirely on the purchasers. Following Garvin's comments, Jensen thanked players for their support, no matter when they had purchased or played it.

According to David Jaffe, then chief executive officer of SIE Worldwide Studios, Shawn Layden had vigorously supported Days Gone. But as soon as Layden left his role in September 2019, Jaffe said "Days Gone was dead". Jaffe said that when trying to pitch a sequel "it was just an uphill battle the whole time" and Ross stated that Sony requested if Sony intellectual properties could be used instead like Syphon Filter. Ross said the sequel would have explored a more technical direction among detailing other features.

Ross claimed that the game sold over eight million copies, yet was treated as a "disappointment" by local studio management. This was in response to the announcement that Ghost of Tsushima, another SIE first-party game (developed by Sucker Punch Productions), had sold over eight million copies. The sales numbers provided by Ross were disputed as they were based on a PlayStation Trophy data tracking site. Ross went on to say that whilst at Bend Studio he saw Days Gone sell over five million copies, the tracking site at the time suggested 5.8 million copies sold.

Film adaptation 
In August 2022, Deadline reported that a film adaptation of the game was in the works with PlayStation Productions and Vendetta Productions producing the movie, and with Sam Heughan in consideration to play the role of Deacon St. John.

References

External links 
 
 

2019 video games
Action-adventure games
Golden Joystick Award winners
2010s horror video games
Motorcycle video games
Open-world video games
PlayStation 4 games
PlayStation 4 Pro enhanced games
Post-apocalyptic video games
Single-player video games
Sony Interactive Entertainment games
Survival video games
Third-person shooters
Unreal Engine games
Video games about cults
Video games about viral outbreaks
Video games about zombies
Video games developed in the United States
Video games set in Oregon
Windows games
Works about outlaw motorcycle clubs